Raju Devnath Parwe is a leader of Indian National Congress and a member of the Maharashtra Legislative Assembly elected from Umred Assembly constituency in Nagpur city.

Positions held
 2019: Elected to Maharashtra Legislative Assembly with 91,968 votes.

References

Living people
Members of the Maharashtra Legislative Assembly
Indian National Congress politicians from Maharashtra
People from Nagpur
Year of birth missing (living people)